61st General Assembly of Nova Scotia is an assembly of the Nova Scotia House of Assembly that was determined in the 2009 Nova Scotia election. The first session of the General Assembly lasted from 25 June 2009 to 25 March 2010. The second session began on 25 March 2010 with a speech from the throne.

Seating plan

Membership changes in the 61st Assembly

List of members

External links

61
2009 establishments in Nova Scotia
21st century in Nova Scotia